"I Really Love You" is a song written by Leroy Swearingen, and originally recorded by his Steubenville, Ohio, vocal group called The Stereos in 1961.

Background
The lead singer on the original recording was Ronnie Collins. This song featured the percussion sounds of people walking in rhythm, first heard in the introduction, as well as between the verses and the Bridge section, and finally heard in the outro before the song's fade. The bass vocal is heard singing the doo wop nonsensical syllables, as well as the Bridge section of the song.

Chart performance
The record, issued on Cub Records, a subsidiary of MGM Records, reached number 29 on the Billboard Top 40 chart and number 15 on the R&B chart.

George Harrison version
Later on, the song was covered by former Beatle George Harrison on his 1982 studio album Gone Troppo. It was also released as the album's second single in the United States and the Netherlands, in February 1983, but failed to chart.

References

1983 singles
George Harrison songs
Song recordings produced by George Harrison
1961 songs
Dark Horse Records singles
Doo-wop songs